Osborne Park is a suburb of Perth, Western Australia in the local government area of the City of Stirling and City of Vincent.

History
Osborne Park was named after William Osborne, a butcher who owned an abattoir and land on Wanneroo Road and who was elected to the Perth Road Board (the City of Stirling's predecessor), in 1875.

Osborne Park was part of an original crown grant of 6,020 acres given to T. R. C. Walters in 1840. After the death of Walters in 1874, William Osborne bought part of his estate, which included the area now known as Osborne Park.

The suburb was originally market gardens, due to rich peaty soil from the swamps between Lake Monger and Herdsman Lake. The area was popular among Chinese, Italian and Yugoslav settlers. The suburb was founded by a private trading concern and had a tram service in the early 1900s through an extension of the Perth tram system from the end of the Leederville line. The suburb is now served by Glendalough train station on the Joondalup line.

Osborne Park became a residential suburb after World War II, but by the 1980s, it was predominantly an industrial area, with only the north-eastern area still residential.

At present
Many warehouses, car yards and small businesses are located in Osborne Park, as well as larger retailers such as Harvey Norman, Officeworks, JB Hi-Fi, The Good Guys, IGA (formerly Supa Valu and Action Supermarkets). Scarborough Beach Road consists of the largest car yard precinct in Australia.

Main Street in Osborne Park is the cafe, shopping and business strip, hosting cafes and restaurants such as Caffe Amaretto, Little Lebanon Restaurant, Siderno Caffe & Ristorante and Posto Matto. The Osborne Park shopping centre consists of major tenant IGA, Australia Post, Montello Gourmet Deli, Sondrea Espresso, Jean_Pierre's Prime Meats Butcher, Osborne Park Newsagency, Thip Mens Hair Design and Shoe Repairs/Cobbler. Next to the Osborne Park Shopping Centre is a family owned Osborne Park Hotel/Pub/Restaurant and Harry Brownes Liquor Store and Drive through Bottle Mart.

References

Suburbs of Perth, Western Australia
Suburbs in the City of Stirling